Bransford is a village and civil parish in the Malvern Hills district of the county of Worcestershire, England. It is situated close to the River Teme and the village of Leigh. It is on the primary route between Worcester and Hereford, the A4103 that runs through the centre of the village. According to the 2011 census, Bransford has a population of 389. The parish shares its parish council with Leigh.

The main church in Bransford is St. Johns the Baptist church, a small Norman building, lit by candlelight. Bransford is part of the West Worcestershire parliamentary constituency and its current Member of Parliament is Harriett Baldwin, who is a Conservative representative.

History 

The origins of the name 'Bransford' are uncertain, but it is believed to mean 'hill-top ford' or 'ford at Bragen'. This is derived from 'braegen', old English for crown of the head or topographically a hill and then 'ford'. In the Doomsday Book, Bransford was called Bradnesforde and included information about Urso from the Pershore Church and mill. Bransford was home to Wulstan de Bransford, the Bishop of Worcester from 1338 to 1349. Following the Poor Law Amendment Act 1834 Bransford Parish ceased to be responsible for maintaining the poor in its parish, a responsibility transferred to Martley Poor Law Union. In the 1870s, Bransford was described as"...a chapelry in Leigh parish, Worcestershire; on the river Teme, adjacent to the Malvern railway, 4½ miles SW by W of Worcester."

Occupation 
It was in 1894 that Bransford was separated from Leigh as an ecclesiastical parish and made into a civil parish of its own right. Bransford was once devoted to pasture and had 2,366 acres of arable land as well as a further 1,062 separate acres of land. There was once a clothing factory by the Teme, explaining why 7 women worked in dress in 1881. There was also a snuff-mill, which then became a corn-mill. When the clothing factory and snuff-mill disappeared, people became involved heavily in agriculture, which explains why in 1881 at least 46 people were engaged in agriculture as their occupation. It was at this time that men were involved in agriculture, whilst women were working in occupations such as domestic services (12 women) and dress services (4 women). Ninety women that lived in Bransford had an unspecified occupation, which was representative of the time. Today, there are 186 residents in employment. 8 people now work in agriculture, compared to 46 in 1881. Wholesale and retail trade now has the highest level of works in Bransford, with 35 people (18.8% of employment) working in this field. Human health and social work has the second highest level of employment in Bransford with jobs in education being third highest. This shows a huge change from 1881 where the majority of jobs were in agriculture, mining and domestic services.

Population and Age 
The population of Bransford has steadily increased since 1881. There was a slight decrease in 1891 but then it continued to increase until 1911. In 1911, the population was at 263 but this then steeply dropped to 198 in 1921. This was most likely due to World War 1 leading to a vast decrease in population. Since 1961, there has been a sharper increase in population, going from 267 to 389 today. It is important to note that there was no census information between 1961 and 2001, so there may have been changes here that were not recorded. Today, the population may be increasing due to a growing population, as well as the growing number of businesses in Bransford. In 1881 there were 129 males and 128 females living in Bransford. This has changed quite drastically today, as there are 187 males and 202 females. Due to this rise in population there was an increase in housing, going from 62 houses in 1881 compared with the 171 households there are in Bransford today.
The mean age in Bransford is 49.4 and the median age is 53. The largest age bracket is 45–59 years old, as 23.9% of people in Bransford are of this age.

Transport 
Bransford lies on the A4103 road, making it accessible. It is served by the 417 and 423 bus services and the nearest train station is Worcester Foregate Street. Until 1965, there was a Great Western Railway station on the Bransford Road. It closed on 5 April 1965, possibly from lack of need. For many, having a car or van is the main method of transport as out of the 171 households, 161 own at least one car or van. Bransford's nearest motorway is the M5.

Local Business 
Today, Bransford is home to a number of small businesses. 
 The Fold, is a craft centre that is located at the New House Farm in Bransford.
 Bank House Hotel, is a hotel in Bransford, that features a spa and golf course. It is used for a number of functions including as a music venue for concerts and dances. 
 Fox Inn, is a Chef & Brewer pub in Bransford. This pub has been flooded by the River Teme a number of times in the past.
 Bransford Nursery, a tree nursery owned by Webb of Wychbold.
 Gilbert's Farm, a farm and bungalow on the edge of Bransford. It contains 118 acres of pasture land.

References

External links

 Leigh & Bransford parish web site

Villages in Worcestershire
Civil parishes in Worcestershire
Malvern Hills District